The Church of St. Catherine is a Roman Catholic church in Vilnius' Old Town. It was founded by the Hetman of the Grand Duchy of Lithuania and Voivode of Vilnius Jan Karol Chodkiewicz in 1618.

Gallery

References

Roman Catholic churches completed in 1625
17th-century Roman Catholic church buildings in Lithuania
Baroque architecture in Lithuania
Roman Catholic churches in Vilnius
1625 establishments in the Polish–Lithuanian Commonwealth